Verkhnepogromnoye is a rural locality (a selo) and the administrative center of Verkhnepogromenskoye Rural Settlement, Sredneakhtubinsky District, Volgograd Oblast, Russia. The population was 1,963 as of 2010. There are 26 streets.

Geography 
Verkhnepogromnoye is located on the Caspian Depression, on the east bank of the Volgograd Reservoir, 39 km northeast of Srednyaya Akhtuba (the district's administrative centre) by road. Volzhanka is the nearest rural locality.

References 

Rural localities in Sredneakhtubinsky District